Legends of Norrath was an online digital collectible card game by Sony Online Entertainment. Legends of Norrath is based on the massively multiplayer online role-playing games EverQuest and EverQuest II. Legends Of Norrath was playable from within either of the two games, or via a stand-alone client.

Legends of Norrath was announced at the 2007 Sony Online Entertainment fan fair by (CEO) John Smedley. It was also previewed at the August 2007 Gen Con Game Fair. Legends of Norrath went online on September 5, 2007.

Legends of Norrath was sunset on August 17, 2016.

Gameplay 

Oathbound is the first set in Legends of Norrath.  There are 4 primary Archetypes of cards: Priest, Mage, Fighter, and Scout.  There is one secondary Archetype, Neutral.  This is only available with two free Avatars available during the release of Ethernauts and Travelers.  Along with each Archetype is the ability to create a deck along a Light, Shadow or Neutral path.  Each player includes 4 quests in their deck (default ruleset) and at any given point in the game, each player has at least one quest in play, and each quest has a value level.  As abilities are "used" in the game their value is applied to a quest.  If a quest attains its level value from one player (over the course of many rounds) that quest is then achieved by that player and counts towards that players progression of achieving 4 quests.

Winning can be achieved by four means: defeating the opponent's avatar, completing 4 player quests, having the opponent run out of cards in his/her deck, or, during a chess clock match, having the opponent run out of time.

Other features 

In Legends of Norrath, players can also fight in tournaments and gain loot cards for both EverQuest and EverQuest II. The interrelation between the MMO and the card game was considered unusual at the time. The tournaments award booster packs or rare cards to the winners, but are limited only to players located in the United States. Players may also choose to create their own avatar, a highly desired feature. Players can pick from 21 races: Human, Wood Elf, Dark Elf, Dwarf, Gnome, Ogre, High Elf, Iksar, Halfling, Troll, Froglok, Erudite, Barbarian, Half Elf, Fae, Arasai, Drakkin, Sarnak, Kerra, Ratonga, or Vah Shir. Players may pick from one male or one female from any of the listed races before answering a questionnaire that determines the avatar's stats. After players buy cards from the online store, they may trade cards with other players. There is also a single player version of the game: a story line that features battles against the AI. Winning each chapter of the single player story line awards one card to the player. With the Ethernauts set, players can earn two different sets of cards (based on archetype) for each scenario as well as a loot card for beating Ethernauts scenarios 1, 3, 5, 7, and 10.

Expansions
Legends of Norrath had 16 sets released between September 2007 and August 2013. Each one featured a number of base cards which could be found in either starter or booster packs, as well as promotional cards and special loot cards which could grant items in either EverQuest or EverQuest II. They would feature characters, locations, and monsters featured in both games, and would sometimes have story arcs revolving around a current expansion or key points in the history of the EverQuest series. Sets were originally released at a rate of one every 3–4 months until Debt of the Ratonga, which debuted almost a year after the previous mini set The Jarsath Detroyer. The final set, Drakkinshard, released 8 months later, would be the last one produced until the game's closure in August 2016.

Notes

References

External links 
 

2007 video games
EverQuest
MacOS games
Windows games
Digital collectible card games
Inactive massively multiplayer online games
Video games developed in the United States